Easyship is a shipping platform that connects sellers and marketplaces to couriers. Easyship was launched in Hong Kong in 2014 and expanded to Singapore in November 2016.

History 
 Easyship is awarded the Best Startup in Asia by TechInAsia
 Easyship wins the Technology Company of the Year in Hong Kong by ComputerWorld
 Announce they have raised a US$4M Series A round of funding

References 

Technology companies established in 2014